Acronicta perdita is a moth of the family Noctuidae. It is found from British Columbia south to California.

The wingspan is 42–46 mm. Adults are on wing from April to July depending on the location.

The larvae feed on Ceanothus and Purshia species.

External links
Bug Guide
Caterpillars of Pacific Northwest Forests and Woodlands

Acronicta
Moths of North America
Moths described in 1874